Katariya is a census town in Ambedaker Nagar district in the Indian state of Uttar Pradesh.

Demographics
 India census, Katariya had a population of 3,888. Males constitute 54% of the population and females 46%. Katariya has an average literacy rate of 69%, higher than the national average of 59.5%: male literacy is 76%, and female literacy is 60%. In Katariya, 13% of the population is under 6 years of age.

References

Cities and towns in Ambedkar Nagar district